Wait Till Helen Comes (also known as Little Girl's Secret) is a 2016 Canadian film directed by Dominic James and written by Victoria Sanchez Mandryk. It is adapted from the book by Mary Downing Hahn. It stars Maria Bello with real life sisters Sophie Nélisse and Isabelle Nélisse, who play step-sisters in the film. The film was released in multiple Canadian cities on 25 November 2016.

Plot
Set in 1982, Molly is a teenage girl living in Michigan with her widowed mother Jean, and younger brother, Michael. When Jean marries Dave, a writer and widower, the new family moves to an isolated rural church, converted into a house, outside the small town of Detroit. On the way, they stop at a psychiatric hospital to pick up Dave’s preadolescence daughter, Heather, who has lived there for three years, suffering the trauma of seeing her mother die in a house fire.

While exploring, Heather is attracted by a blue butterfly, following it deeper into the woods. Later, when exploring the graveyard adjoining the churchyard; cared for by kindly old Mr. Simmons; they find a memorial plaque (not a grave) for a six-year-old girl with the initials H.E.H., the same initials as Heather. Molly and Michael follow up with Mrs. Williams, the local librarian, who finds records and photos explaining that the plaque commemorates Helen Harper, who died with her parents in a fire in 1886, none of whose remains were found.

Heather makes friends with the ghost of Helen. Helen leads her to the ruins of her former house beside a river, and the two play there regularly. Besides Heather, Molly is the only one who can see Helen– a gift that Molly shares with her dead father, who had been considered mentally unstable for his visions. When Molly tries to tell the rest of the family about Helen, they think she's crazy. Only Mr. Simmons believes her, as his departed wife Rose shared the same gift when she was alive. He also warns Molly to be careful, as a number of young girls have gone missing over the years after befriending Helen’s ghost (a girl is seen walking into the river during the opening credits).

Molly, trying to foster a relationship with Heather, keeps an eye on her to make sure she stays safe. When Heather runs away to Helen's house, Molly’s father appears to her in a dream to warn her. Molly wakes and runs after Heather to make sure nothing happens. When she gets there, she sees a vision of how Helen accidentally closed a trap door, which she wasn't able to unlock when her parents were in the basement. She inadvertently knocks a candle over but stays too long in the ensuing fire as she attempts to open the trap door. The locked basement eventually kills her parents, and a burning Helen ran into the river, where she drowned. Heather tries to join Helen in the river and starts to drown. Molly runs in to save her, bringing the unconscious Heather to shore and resuscitating her. Heather reveals that she accidentally killed her mother when trying to cook for her, starting a house fire. She believes that she and Helen, whose story is similar, truly understand each other.

Molly finds the trap door to the basement in the ruins and, with Helen's help, gets it open. Inside, they find the corpses of Helen's parents, whose spirits had been trapped. The blue butterfly, the nickname that Helen's parents called her by, lands on the corpses. Michael arrives in time to join Molly and Heather as they all watch the spirits of Helen's parents, finally freed, depart to the heavens with Helen.

Cast
 Sophie Nélisse as Molly
 Isabelle Nélisse as Heather
 Liam Dickinson as Michael
 Maria Bello as Jean
 Callum Keith Rennie as Dave
 Cassandra Tusa as Teenage Girl
 Frank Adamson as Mr. Simmons
 Mary Downing Hahn as Mrs. Williams
 Abigail Pniowsky as Helen (Harper/Miller)
 Alexia Alderson as Helen’s voice
 John B. Lowe as Sheriff
 Emily Parker as Mrs. Miller (Mrs. Harper, remarried)

Production
The film was produced by Caramel Film Productions in association with Mednick Productions, with producers Victoria Sanchez Mandryk, Don Carmody, Valérie d'Auteuil, Ian Dimerman, and Brendon Sawatzky.

Executive Producers are Scott Mednick, Manuel Freedman, Skyler Mednick, Dominique Desrochers, and Alexandre Grenier.

On the 28th August 2014, actress Sophie Nélisse stated on her Twitter account that she will act in a film adaptation of the book as Molly. She also stated that her sister, Isabelle, would act in the film as well. On the 12th September 2014, Variety announced that financing and cast were in place and principal photography would commence on the production of a film adaptation of Wait Till Helen Comes. The work would be directed by Dominic James, and would star Maria Bello and the Nélisse sisters. Production was slated to begin later that same month.

Principal photography began on the 28th September 2014 in Winnipeg, Manitoba. Author Mary Downing Hahn appears in the film in a speaking role, after having revealed to screenwriter Mandryk that as a little girl she had always wanted to be an actress in movies. Wait Till Helen Comes is the first of her books to be adapted into a feature film.

References

External links
 
 Wait Till Helen Comes at Library and Archives Canada

2016 thriller films
Films produced by Don Carmody
Canadian thriller films
English-language Canadian films
Films set in 1982
Films set in Michigan
2010s English-language films
2010s Canadian films